Branko Hofman (29 November 1929 – 12 June 1991) was a Slovene poet, writer and playwright. As well as his poetry he is best known for his 1981 novel Noč do jutra (Night Till Morning) that deals with the subject of the Goli Otok prison.

Hofman was born in Rogatec, then part of Yugoslavia, in 1929. He studied Comparative literature at the University of Ljubljana and worked as a journalist at  Radio Koper and editor at Večer and the DZS Publishing House.

He won the Levstik Award in 1981 for his book Ringo Star.

Published works

Poetry 
 Pred jutrom (Before Morning), 1951
 Za oblaki so zvezde (There Are Stars Behind the Clouds), 1956
 Mavrica v dlaneh (The Rainbow in My Palm), 1962
 Trapez (Trapezoid), 1970
 In večno življenje mesa (And the Eternal Life of Meat), 1972
 Pesmi (Poems), 1972
 Lok (Arch), 1977
 Ne kliči, tu ni škržatov (Don't Call Out, There Are No Cicadas Here), 1989

Prose 
 Vrabčki (Sparrows), 1955
 Strah (Fear), 1961
 Ljubezen (Love), 1965
 Ringo Star (Ringo Star), 1980
 Noč do jutra (Night Till Morning), 1981
 Tonka Paconka (Tonka Paconka), 1982
 Kdo mamici soli pamet (Who Is Being Clever With Mum), 1985
 Ringo potepuh (Ringo the Vagabond), 1990

Drama 
 Življenje zmaguje (Life Wins), 1955
 Svetloba velike samote (The Light of Great Loneliness), 1957
 Zvezde na jutranjem nebu (Stars in the Morning Sky), 1958
 Dan in vsi dnevi (The Day and All Days), 1962
 Mož brez obraza (The Faceless Man), 1971

References

Slovenian poets
Slovenian male poets
Slovenian editors
Slovenian dramatists and playwrights
1929 births
1991 deaths
Levstik Award laureates
University of Ljubljana alumni
20th-century poets
20th-century dramatists and playwrights
People from Rogatec